Andrew Oliver Kumarage (16 January 1934 – 21 April 2012), (BDiv, DipRE), was the third Bishop of Kurunegala, Sri Lanka.

Andrew Kumarage was born on 16 January 1934, the eldest child in a family of five. His father, Stephen, was a teacher and his mother, Mary, a nurse, who both worked as lay ministers for the Church of Ceylon. Kumarage was identified by the then Bishop of Kurunegala, Lakdasa De Mel, as a prospective leader for the Church and an early candidate for ordination. In 1954 he went to study theology at Bishop’s College, Calcutta in India and after four years of study he received a degree of Bachelor of Divinity. In 1958 Kumarage returned to Kurunegala and was subsequently made a Deacon on 1 May that year. On 23 May 1959 he was ordained as a priest in the Diocese of Kurunagala.

Kumarage was an inaugural faculty member at the Theological College of Lanka. He was also selected as the Chairperson of the Board of Governors at Trinity College, Kandy and served on the Governing Body of the CMS Schools. Kumarage subsequently trained at the Westhill College of Education in Birmingham, England, where he completed a Diploma of Religious Education. Upon his return to Sri Lanka he was made responsible for Religious Education in the Diocese of Kurungala.

On 6 May 1984 he was consecrated as the third Bishop of Kurunegala, succeeding Bishop Lakshman Wickremasinghe. After 16 years he retired from the position in 2000.

In the years following his retirement he wrote and published a book on the Disciples of Jesus and later compiled a Personal Book of Prayers for Clergy. He was also appointed as the Chair of the Board of Management of the Ecumenical Institute for Study and Dialogue and remained a member of the EISD Board until his death.

Kumarage died on 21 April 2012 at the age of 78.

See also
Church of Ceylon
Bishop of Kurunegala

Bibliography 
A Priest's Book of Private Devotions (Kurunagala: Privately Published, 2005)

References

External links
 The Church of Ceylon (Anglican Communion)
 Anglican Church of Ceylon News
 Worship Resources including a Prayer for Sri Lanka written by Metropolitan Lakdasa de Mel

20th-century Anglican bishops in Asia
Sri Lankan Anglican bishops
Sri Lankan educational theorists
Sinhalese priests
Anglican bishops of Kurunegala
1934 births
2012 deaths